Dhanushkodi is an unreleased Malayalam-language Indian action thriller film directed by Priyadarshan and written by T. Damodaran, and starring Mohanlal and Girija Shettar in the lead roles. The film was made in the year 1989.

Plot 

Dhanushkodi is about drug cartels of South India based at Chennai. Sreenivasan plays an undercover cop who is having an identity of a journalist. He meets his old friend Mohanlal who is working in a Government Office and informs him about his mission. Raghuvaran plays the kingpin of drug business. As the investigation progresses, Sreenivasan's attains a shocking information as he realizes the real guy behind Raghuvaran is Mohanlal.

Cast 

Mohanlal
Sreenivasan
Girija Shettar
Raghuvaran
Kakka Ravi
Vincent

Dropped 
The film, an action thriller, was similar to Aryan, but the crew realised the film was not going to be very financially feasible, so they dropped the project.

References 

Unreleased Malayalam-language films
1980s Malayalam-language films